Stephanie Anne Booth (25 May 1946 – 18 September 2016), also known as Stephanie Anne Lloyd, was a British transsexual business owner and hotelier, based in Llangollen.

She starred in the reality television series about her businesses Hotel Stephanie for BBC Wales in 2008 and 2009.

Early life
Born on 25 May 1946 as Keith Michael Hull, in St Albans, Hertfordshire. Her parents later became Jehovah Witnesses.

Adult life
After finishing secondary school Keith worked as laboratory technician, cinema manager, costing clerk and retail chain manager. In 1968 he got married and fathered three kids - twin boys and girl. In early 1980's, while living in northwest England, he separated from the family and began gender reassignment through a specialist psychologist at Wythenshawe Hospital, Manchester, followed by September 1983 surgery at Charing Cross Hospital, London. Since then she used female name, Stephanie Anne Lloyd. Divorce followed. Due to publicity by tabloid newspapers Lloyd lost her managerial job and was unable find new one.

In 1984 Lloyd decided to create Transformation, a business catering to the transgender and transvestite community. She was persuaded that a massage service that offered prostitution services was both legal, and could quickly solve her financial difficulties. Year later was arrested for running a bawdy house and pleaded guilty. In 1985 she started to live with David Booth, her business partner. They married in February 1986 in Sri Lanka, but British law at this time didn't recognize such marriages.

Later business ventures included a transgender mail order catalogue, and a contact magazine. This was followed by a transgender hotel in Manchester, and a second shop in London opposite Euston railway station.

Unable to open a shop in Scotland due to Scottish law, the company opened a site in Newcastle upon Tyne. They also expanded their mail order business to cover both Germany and mainland Europe, and the United States. In 1992 Booth founded the Albany Gender Identity Clinic as a centre for transsexuals to seek specialist medical advice and guidance on their condition.

Hotel Stephanie
In 2008, Mentorn Cymru began production of reality television series Hotel Stephanie for BBC Wales. The series focused on Booth and her running of her hotel chain, based mainly on activities around Llangollen. The programme was commissioned for a second series in 2009, which focused on the couples' takeover and refurbishment of The Wynnstay Arms hotel in Wrexham.

On 7 July 2011, Booth's hotels went into financial administration. Administrators closed the Wynnstay Arms, The Anchor in Ruthin and The Bridge Hotel, Chester with immediate effect and the funhouses in Mold, Wrexham and Oswestry, as these premises were rented and default on rent payment could not be avoided. All four hotels, which had been trading well, were put up for sale.

Wrexham F.C.
In 2011, Booth announced her intention to take over Wrexham A.F.C., with an interest-free loan to save it from going into financial administration and the plan to raise £5 million to purchase the club in a community-based venture.

Death
On the evening of 18 September 2016, Booth was killed in a tractor accident at her smallholding farm on the outskirts of Corwen, Denbighshire. She was aged 70, and survived by her husband, David.

Autobiographies 
Short autobiography The official autobiography of sex-change Stephanie Anne Lloyd was published in 1990 by TMC Publishing Ltd.

Autobiography Stephanie: A Girl in a Million, co-written with Sandra Sedgbeer, was published in 1991 by Ebury Press. Dutch translation was published in 1993, Czech translation in 1994.

Online version of the autobiography is available at the web of Transformation company. It includes chapter written in 2014, briefly covering events after publishing the book, including the imprisonment due to false charge and the failure of hotel business.

References

External links 
 Stephanie's Story, online autobiography, updated in 2014

1946 births
2016 deaths
People from St Albans
People from Llangollen
British hoteliers
Transgender women
Transgender businesspeople
English transgender people
English LGBT businesspeople
English LGBT rights activists
Road incident deaths in Wales
Sex industry in Wales
20th-century English businesswomen
20th-century English businesspeople
21st-century English businesswomen
21st-century English businesspeople